The 2023 Colorado Buffaloes football team will represent the University of Colorado Boulder as a member of the Pac-12 Conference during the 2022 NCAA Division I FBS football season. The Buffaloes will be led by first year head coach Deion Sanders. They play their home games on campus at Folsom Field in Boulder, Colorado.

Previous season

The Buffaloes finished the 2022 season at 1–11 (1–8 in Pac-12). After losing the first five games of the season, Colorado fired head coach Karl Dorrell and defensive coordinator Chris Wilson on October 2. Offensive coordinator Mike Sanford Jr. was named as the team's interim head coach for the remainder of the season. On December 3, Deion Sanders was named the new head coach of the Buffaloes.

Offseason

Recruiting class

Transfers

Outgoing

Incoming

Schedule
The Colorado Buffaloes and the Pac-12 announced the 2023 football schedule on January 18, 2023.

Staff

References

Colorado
Colorado Buffaloes football seasons
Colorado Buffaloes football